The United Arab Emirates is a country at the southeast end of the Arabian Peninsula on the Persian Gulf.

The economy is the second largest in the Arab world (after Saudi Arabia), with a gross domestic product (GDP) of $570 billion (AED2.1 trillion) in 2014. The United Arab Emirates has been successfully diversifying its economy, although the UAE remains extremely reliant on oil. With the exception of Dubai, most of the UAE is dependent on oil revenues. Petroleum and natural gas continue to play a central role in the economy, especially in Abu Dhabi. More than 85% of the UAE's economy was based on the oil exports in 2009. While Abu Dhabi and other UAE emirates have remained relatively conservative in their approach to diversification, Dubai, which has far smaller oil reserves, was bolder in its diversification policy. In 2011, oil exports accounted for 77% of the UAE's state budget.

Notable firms 
This list includes notable companies with primary headquarters located in the country. The industry and sector follow the Industry Classification Benchmark taxonomy. Organizations that have ceased operations are included and noted as defunct.

See also
 Economy of the United Arab Emirates
List of largest companies of the United Arab Emirates

References

 
United Arab Emirates